The Sensational Trial is a 1923 German silent film directed by Karl Freund and starring Erich Kaiser-Titz, Käthe Haack and Heinrich Schroth.

The film's sets were designed by the art director Heinrich Richter.

Cast
 Erich Kaiser-Titz as Defense lawyer
 Käthe Haack as Defense lawyer's wife
 Heinrich Schroth as Fragwürdige Existenz
 Hugo Flink as Angeklagter
 Willy Kaiser-Heyl as Judge
 Arnold Czempin as Fremder Gast
 Emil Rameau as Untersuchungsrichter
 Preben J. Rist as Redakteur
 Anna von Palen as Mutter

References

Bibliography
 Bock, Hans-Michael & Bergfelder, Tim. The Concise CineGraph. Encyclopedia of German Cinema. Berghahn Books, 2009.

External links

1923 films
Films of the Weimar Republic
German silent feature films
Films directed by Karl Freund
German black-and-white films
1920s German films